Ponderosa Skatepark is a public skatepark in Bend, Oregon. It opened in 2013. The original park was built in 1997, but poor construction and design coupled with heavy use rendered it obsolete. The new park is used by visitors and local skateboarders.

Construction 

Bend Park & Recreation District budgeted about $360,000 for the new park. $40,000 was raised by a local organization called PUSH (Promoting Urban Skate Habitats) through a fundraising campaign and in-kind donations.

Following Bend PRD standards, Spohn Ranch was contracted to do the construction. One of Spohn Ranch's leading skatepark designers, Charlie Wilkins, held focus groups with local skateboarders to find out what features and terrain styles they wanted. After a couple months of planning, the skatepark began construction in the summer of 2013 and opening that fall.

Facilities 
The roughly  park includes the following features:  
 Half-pipe section 
 Multiple quarter pipe sections 
 Two sets of stairs 
 A variety of wedges, hips and ledges 
 Grind rails and ledges 
 Radius wave 
 Pump bumps and radius wave 
 Restrooms, picnic shelters and other amenities close to the skatepark.

References 

2013 establishments in Oregon
Bend, Oregon
Municipal parks in Oregon
Skateparks in the United States